Boris Grigoryevich Kuznetsov (5 October 1903 – 5 September 1984) was a Soviet philosopher and historian. In 1931, he was appointed Head of the research institute of the energy industry and electrification. In 1936, Boris Kuznetsov became deputy director of the Vavilov Institute for the History of Science and Technology.

Publications
His biography of Einstein received the greatest circulation, was published many times in dozens of countries, invited numerous comments everywhere and is perhaps known to every physicist and to many thousands of other professional men.

Awards
He was awarded the State Stalin Prize and two Orders of the Red Banner of Labour.

References

Literature
 
 

1903 births
1984 deaths
Soviet philosophers
Communist Party of the Soviet Union members
Soviet historians
Stalin Prize winners
Soviet Jews